Rasāyana (रसायन) is a Pali and Sanskrit word literally meaning path (ayana) of essence (rasa).  It is an early ayurvedic medical term referring to techniques for lengthening lifespans and invigorating the body. It is one of the eight areas of medicine in Sanskrit literature. In Vedic alchemical context, "rasa" also translates to "metal or a mineral"

History

The more general name for the Indian science of alchemy or proto-chemistry is Rasaśāstra (रसशास्त्र in Sanskrit), or "The Science of Mercury," in Nepali, Marathi, Hindi, Kannada and several other languages.

Early Indian alchemical texts discuss the use of prepared forms of mercury or cinnabar (see samskaras).
However, there is also ample mention of the preparation of medical tinctures in the early science of Indian alchemy.

Significant progress in alchemy was made in ancient India. An 11th-century Persian chemist and physician named Abū Rayhān Bīrūnī reported "[the Indians] have a science similar to alchemy which is quite peculiar to them.  They call it Rasâyana, a word composed with rasa, i.e., gold.  It means an art which is restricted to certain operations, drugs, and compound medicines, most of which are taken from plants. Its principles restore the health of those who were ill beyond hope, and give back youth to fading old age..."

Two famous examples were Nagarjunacharya and Nityanadhiya. Nagarjunacharya , was one of the most prominent chemists in the history of Indian alchemy. He ran many experiments in his  laboratory known as the "Rasashala". His book, Rasaratanakaram is a famous example of ancient Indian medicine, in which he describes the procedure of transmuting base metals like mercury, into gold. Due to his great contributions and insight in chemistry, he was appointed as chancellor in the university of Nalanda. From the 14th century onwards, many materials from rasāyana and rasaśāstra were translated and integrated in the Persian texts written by Muslim scholars in South Asia (Speziale 2019).

Aim and types

Rasayana therapy enriches rasa with nutrients to help one attain longevity, memory, intelligence, health, youthfulness, excellence of luster, complexion and voice, optimum development of physique and sense organs, mastery over phonetics, respectability and brilliance.

Goals 
The historical aims of rasāyana were diverse, but the effects attributed to a treatment were typically either longevity, health, intellect, sexuality or magical abilities.

 Lifespan and ageing
 Lengthen the lifespan
 Stay young; stop and reverse ageing and its signs, like wrinkles and greying
 Health
 Renew or retain functions and senses of the body
 Overcome diseases, particularly serious and challenging diseases associated with old age
 Cognitive power
 Remember more
 Get smarter
 Understand more
 Virility
 Boost sexual stamina
 Get stronger
 Become more fertile
 Special powers
 Gain magical powers to manipulate the world 
 Gain supernatural abilities in strength, agility, constitution and longevity

In essence, rasāyana promotes aspects of vitality.

Types of rasayana 
Kamya Rasayanas are promoters of normal health. These boost body energy levels, immunity and general health.
Pranakamya – Promoter of vitality and longevity
Medhakamya – Promoter of intelligence.
Srikamya – Promoter of complexion.
Naimittika Rasayanas help to fight a specific disease.

In pursuit of these matters, herbal prescriptions with many herbal substances, preserved in ghee and honey are given.  Chyawanprasha is one of the traditional rasayanas.  Specific adaptogenic herbs are also included in rasayanas including haritaki, amla, shilajit, ashwaganda, holy basil, guduchi and shatavari.

Several rasayana herbs have been tested for adaptogenic properties:
The whole, aqueous, standardized extracts of selected plants (Tinospora cordifolia, Asparagus racemosus, Emblica officinalis, Withania somnifera, Piper longum and Terminalia chebula) were administered orally to experimental animals, in a dose extrapolated from the human dose, following which they were exposed to a variety of biological, physical and chemical stressors. These plants were found to offer protection against these stressors, as judged by using markers of stress responses and objective parameters for stress manifestations. Using a model of cisplatin induced alterations in gastrointestinal motility, the ability of these plants to exert a normalizing effect, irrespective of direction of pathological change was tested.... All the plant drugs were found to be safe in both acute and subacute toxicity studies. Studies on the mechanisms of action of the plants revealed that they all produced immunostimulation. The protection offered by Tinospora cordifolia against stress induced gastric mucosal damage was lost if macrophage activity was blocked. Emblica officinalis strengthened the defence mechanisms against free radical damage induced during stress. The effect of Emblica officinalis appeared to depend on the ability of target tissues to synthesize prostaglandins. Recent data obtained with Tinospora cordifolia have led researchers to suggest that it may induce genotypic adaptation, further opening the arena for more research and experimentation.

Rasayana formulae

Puri has given detailed account of Classical formulations such as Amrit Rasayana, Brahm Rasayana, Jawahar Mohra, Kamdugdha Ras, Laxami Vilas Ras, Laxman Vilas Ras, Madanoday Modak, Makrdhawaj vati, Manmath Ras, Mukta Panchamrit Rasayana, Nari Kalyan Pak, Navjeevan Ras, Navratna Ras, Navratnakalp Amrit, Panchamrit Ras, Paradi Ras, Ramchuramni Ras, Rattivalbh Pak, Shukar Amrit Vati, Smritisagar Ras, Suvarn Malini Vasant, Suvarn Vasant Malti, Swapanmehtank, Vasant Kusmakar Ras, Visha Rasaayana, Vrihda Vangeshwar Rasa.

These classical Rasayan formulas, contain a large number of ingredients, including minerals, pearl, coral and gems, and include a specially processed (samskara) mercury (the word ras indicates mercury as an ingredient). Because of negative publicity and cost factor, the use of the classical rasayana formulas has declined considerably, and most of the preparations available now have herbal ingredients with a couple of mineral and animal products. The non-availability and wild life protection act has made the use of musk, amber, and parts of wild-life animals nearly impossible.

The current Rasayan formulas are based on such ingredients as amla (Emblica officinalis) which, if fresh, has high content of vitamin C, Terminalia belerica, Terminalia chebula, Shilajit, Long pepper, Black pepper, Ginger, processed Guggul, Guduchi, Ashwaganda, Shatavari and similar ingredients.

Rasayan Shastr in Ancient India was much less developed than today. Nevertheless, the use and practice of Rasayan was widespread in Ancient India, and some examples of applied rasayan include paints used in the caves of Ajanta and Ellora, Maharashtra state, the steel of Vishnustambha (literal meaning: the tower of Vishnu), and a processed wood sample in the Kondivade caves near the Rajmachi fort in Maharashtra.

Rasayana 
In many Indian homes, rasayana (fruit squash) juices are prepared and served as drink, desert or as accompaniment to meals. In Tulunadu region of India, Banana and Mango Rasayana are made by mixing fruit pulp with cow's milk or coconut milk to a thick consistency. This rasayana may be drunk as juice by diluting with water or milk. With thick consistency it is used as accompaniment to dosa, chapati or meals. Rasayana may also be known as lassi. Many believe this rasayana helps to beat the heat of Indian summers.

Rasayana is often given to devotees as Prasadam. In this case, it consists of thin slices of banana, milk or curd, sugar and honey.

See also
A History of Hindu Chemistry, a two-volume book by Prafulla Chandra Ray published in 1902 and 1909

References

Further reading

 Winston, David & Maimes, Steven. Adaptogens: Herbs for Strength, Stamina, and Stress Relief, Healing Arts Press, 2007. Contains monographs and information on health benefits for the following rasayana herbs that are identified as adaptogens: Amla, Ashwagandha, Guduchi, Holy Basil (tulsi), Shatavari and Shilajit.
 Alan Keith Tillotson PhD, A.H.G., D.Ay, (Author), O.M.D., L.Ac., Nai-shing Hu Tillotson (Contributor), M.D., Robert Abel Jr. (Contributor) The One Earth Herbal Sourcebook: Everything You Need to Know About Chinese, Western, and Ayurvedic Herbal Treatments Kensington press, 
 Puri, H.S. "RASAYAN: Ayurvedic Herbs for Longevity and Rejuvenation".  Taylor & Francis, London, 2003.  Gives monographic account and illustrations of 57 plants used as Rasayana in India, along with old as well as new Rasayan formulations.
 Puri, H.S. Ayurvedic Minerals, Gems and Animal Products for Longevity and Rejuvenation. India Book Store, Delhi 2006.  Scientific details of all the ingredients other than herb, used as Rasayana in Ayurveda is given.  The study on gold, mercury, sulfur, musk and Shilajit are given in good details.
  Anonymus:  National Seminar on Rasayana, 8–10 March 1999, Proceedings, Central Council for Research in Ayurveda and Siddha, New Delhi.  A very good account of various aspects of RASAYANA by many learned authors.

Fabrizio Speziale, “Rasāyana and Rasaśāstra in the Persian Medical Culture of South Asia”, History of Science in South Asia, 7, 2019, pp. 1-41.

Alchemical traditions
Ancient Indian medicine
Ayurveda
Juice